Dr John Mulcahy is an Australian businessman who has held various chief executive roles.

Career 
Mulcahy has held a number of non-executive positions, including: 
 Guardian of the Australian Government Future Fund
 Non-executive director of Mirvac
 Non-executive director and chairman of Coffey International
 Non-executive director of GWA International
 Non-executive director of the Great Barrier Reef Foundation\
 Chairman of the advisory board of Pottinger
 Managing Director and Chief Executive Officer of Suncorp
 Group Executive of Investment and Insurance Services division at the Commonwealth Bank
 held a number of senior roles during his 14 years at Lendlease, including Chief Executive Officer of Lend Lease Property Investment and Chief Executive Officer of Civil & Civic.
 Non-executive chairman of Orix Australia

Mulcahy graduated with a Doctor of Philosophy in Engineering (University of Sydney) and is a Fellow of the Institute of Engineers.

References

Australian chief executives
Living people
Year of birth missing (living people)
University of Sydney alumni